The Homestead Young Americans were an American basketball team based in Homestead, Pennsylvania that was a member of the Central Basketball League.

The team was replaced by Canton during the 1906/07 Postseason Series, but returned to the league the following season. For their final season, the team was known as the Homestead Steeltowners. The team dropped out of the league that season and forfeited their final 10 games.

Year-by-year

Defunct basketball teams in the United States
Basketball teams in Pennsylvania